Harlequin toad is a non-scientific name for any of several varieties of frog or toad, including the following:

 Atelopus, a genus of Central and South American toads in the family Bufonidae
 Harlequin poison frog (Oophaga histrionica), a species of South American poison dart toad  in the family Dendrobatidae
 Harlequin tree frog (Rhacophorus pardalis), found in Southeast Asia and belongs to the family Rhacophoridae

Animal common name disambiguation pages